William Broke (or Brook) was an English 16th-century college head and university vice-chancellor at the University of Oxford.

Broke was a Doctor of Decretals and a Warden of All Souls College, Oxford between 1504 and 1524. In 1520, Broke was appointed Vice-Chancellor of Oxford University.

References

Bibliography
 

Year of birth unknown
Year of death unknown
English Roman Catholics
English lawyers
Canon law jurists
Wardens of All Souls College, Oxford
Vice-Chancellors of the University of Oxford
16th-century English lawyers